Ghanghata is a village and tehsil in the Sant Kabir Nagar district in the Uttar Pradesh state in India. It is one of three tehsils in the Sant Kabir Nagar district.

Demography
In 2011 Ghanghata had a total population of 425,101, of which males constituted 214,258 (50.4%) of the population, and females 210,843 (49.6%), according to India census. In 2021 the population had increased to 641,851.

Towns and villages
There is one town and 579 villages in Ghanghata Tehsil, including:
 Chhapra Magarbi

References

Villages in Sant Kabir Nagar district